A Jest of God is a novel by Canadian author Margaret Laurence. It was first published in 1966. It won the Governor General's Award for 1966 and was made into the 1968 Paul Newman/Joanne Woodward film Rachel, Rachel.

Plot summary
The novel follows schoolteacher Rachel Cameron through a summer affair and its consequences on her life.  Although Rachel is in her 30s, the book serves to document a second adolescence as she comes to recognize herself as the adult to her aging mother.

A Jest of God was adapted to the 1968 movie "Rachel, Rachel" starring Joanne Woodward and directed by Paul Newman.  The film was nominated for four Academy Awards in 1969, including Best Picture.

Notes

External links

1966 Canadian novels
McClelland & Stewart books
Novels by Margaret Laurence
Governor General's Award-winning fiction books
Canadian novels adapted into films